The Ziliujing Formation is a geological formation in China, It is Early Jurassic in age. It is part of the stratigraphy of the Sichuan Basin. The dinosaur Gongxianosaurus and indeterminate theropod material are known from the Dongyuemiao Member of the formation, as well as dinosaur footprints, Zizhongosaurus and indeterminate prosauropods from the Da'anzhai Member. The basal sauropod Sanpasaurus is known from the Maanshan Member. An unnamed stegosaur and the pliosauroid plesiosaur Sinopliosaurus are also known from this formation but they were found an indeterminate member. An unnamed teleosaurid known from a complete skull has also been found in the formation, pending a formal description. The deposition environment during the Da'anzhai Member in the lower Toarcian is thought to have been that of a giant freshwater lake encompassing the whole of the Sichuan basin, around 3 times larger than Lake Superior, coeval with the Toarcian Oceanic Anoxic Event around 183 Ma.



Paleofauna

Bivalves

Phyllopods

Fish

Sarcopterygii

Plesiosaurs

Testudinata

Crocodrylomorphs

Dinosaurs

Flora

References

Jurassic System of Asia
Jurassic China
Toarcian Stage